Kimberly Navarro (born April 26, 1981) is an American former competitive ice dancer. With partner Brent Bommentre, she is the 2008 Four Continents bronze medalist and a two-time (2008 & 2009) U.S. national bronze medalist.

Personal life 
Navarro was born on April 26, 1981 in Santa Rosa, California. In May 2004, she graduated cum laude from Columbia University. In May 2016, she married Mark Freeman in Ketchum, Idaho. Their daughter, Anna Granada Freeman, was born on May 6, 2017, in San Francisco.

Career 
Navarro competed with Robert Shmalo early in her career.

Navarro teamed up with Brent Bommentre after a tryout in April 2005. They won the bronze medal at the 2008 U.S. Championships, and were chosen to represent the United States at the 2008 Four Continents, where they finished in 3rd, and the 2008 World Championships in Gothenburg, Sweden, where they were 12th. At the 2009 Nationals, Navarro/Bommentre again finished 3rd, but were left off the Worlds team in favor of Tanith Belbin / Benjamin Agosto, who had missed U.S. Nationals due to injury. They did compete at the 2009 Four Continents, where they finished in sixth place.

In the Olympic season, Navarro/Bommentre finished 4th at U.S. Nationals, and were not named to the Olympic team. When Belbin/Agosto ended their competitive career following the Olympics, they were selected to compete at the 2010 World Championships. They were 14th in their second Worlds appearance. Navarro/Bommentre announced their retirement from competition on May 11, 2010.

In 2011, Navarro joined the cast of Battle of the Blades for the show's third season, and was originally paired with the late Wade Belak. In the season-opening episode, Russ Courtnall was named as her partner.

Navarro/Bommentre perform with the Ice Theatre of New York and, in November 2012, they taped an appearance in an episode of Glee.

Programs

With Bommentre

With Shmalo

Results 
GP: Grand Prix

With Bommentre

With Shmalo

With Tinney and Hart

References

External links

 
 
 

American female ice dancers
Living people
1981 births
Sportspeople from Santa Rosa, California
Battle of the Blades participants
Four Continents Figure Skating Championships medalists
Dancers from California
21st-century American women